The 1999 Adur District Council election took place on 6 May 1999 to elect members of Adur District Council in West Sussex, England. One third of the council was up for election and the Liberal Democrat party lost overall control of the council to no overall control.

After the election, the composition of the council was:
Labour 15
Liberal Democrat 13
Conservative 8
Independent 2

Results
The results saw the Liberal Democrats lose their majority on a council they had controlled since 1986. Overall turnout in the election was 38%.

References

1999
1999 English local elections
1990s in West Sussex